Prepelița is a commune in Sîngerei District, Moldova. It is composed of four villages: Clișcăuți, Mihailovca, Prepelița and Șestaci.

Notable people
 Ion Ignatiuc

References

Communes of Sîngerei District